The U.S. Post Office, also known as the Federal Building and Courthouse, is a historic government building in Gadsden, Alabama.

Architecture and history

The Beaux-Arts-style building was constructed in 1909 by architects and engineers in the Office of the Supervising Architect under James Knox Taylor. When it was completed in 1910 it was a one story building housing facilities for the United States Post Office. Only a year later construction began on an addition which added two stories to the building, providing space for the United States District Court for the Northern District of Alabama and other federal agencies. This was completed in 1913, and in 1935-36 a large rear wing was added.

The post office moved to a new building in the 1960s, and the building was fully vacated by the government after 2012. In 2017, the building was purchased by Campbell Development, LLC, a firm owned by Gadsden natives Anna Campbell and Caleb Campbell. It now serves as a professional office space for a number of businesses.

It was listed on the National Register of Historic Places on June 3, 1976.

See also 
List of United States post offices

References 

Buildings and structures in Gadsden, Alabama
National Register of Historic Places in Etowah County, Alabama
Government buildings completed in 1909
Gadsden
Beaux-Arts architecture in Alabama
1909 establishments in Alabama